Songs From the Hydrogen Bar: A Tribute to Chemlab (or Stapled and Sutured) is a tribute album  and various artists compilation album released on September 27, 2013 released by MOMT. The album was named after Chemlab's website and 1993 debut album Burn Out at the Hydrogen Bar, released by  Fifth Colvmn Records.

Reception
Robert Ryttman at Zero Magazine credited Songs From the Hydrogen Bar: A Tribute to Chemlab with being partially successful but noted he would prefer to listen directly to the source.

Track listing

Personnel
Adapted from the Songs From the Hydrogen Bar: A Tribute to Chemlab liner notes.

Release history

References

External links 
 Songs From the Hydrogen Bar: A Tribute to Chemlab at Discogs (list of releases)
  Songs From the Hydrogen Bar: A Tribute to Chemlab at Bandcamp

2007 compilation albums
Covers albums